Be MAX is a cover album by Japanese vocal group MAX. Released on September 8, 2010, by Sonic Groove as part of the group's 15th anniversary celebration, the album was offered in two editions: CD only and CD with bonus DVD. It features the group's Eurobeat covers of 15 popular J-pop songs from the 1970s, 1980s, and 1990s. The CD only release includes the bonus track "Tora Tora Tora" (15th Anniversary Mix).

The album peaked at No. 19 on Oricon's weekly albums chart.

Track listing

Charts

References

External links
 Official website
 
 

2010 albums
MAX (band) albums
Avex Group albums
Japanese-language albums
Covers albums